Hwang Seok-keun (born September 3, 1960) is a Korean football forward who played for South Korea in the 1980 Asian Cup. He also played for Korea University.

International record

References

External links

South Korean footballers
South Korea international footballers
1960 births
Living people
K League 1 players
Jeju United FC players
Korea University alumni
Association football forwards
1980 AFC Asian Cup players